Jo Dae-don (born 8 January 1984) is a South Korean diver. He competed in the men's 10 metre platform event at the 2000 Summer Olympics.

References

1984 births
Living people
South Korean male divers
Olympic divers of South Korea
Divers at the 2000 Summer Olympics
Place of birth missing (living people)
Divers at the 1998 Asian Games
Asian Games competitors for South Korea